
The King's Fire Service Medal, introduced in 1954, is awarded to members of the fire services in the United Kingdom for distinguished service or gallantry. It was also formerly awarded by Commonwealth countries, most of which now have their own honours systems.

Members of recognised fire brigades were eligible for the King's Police Medal from its creation in July 1909, with the award renamed the King's Police and Fire Services Medal in September 1940. In 1954 separate medals were established for the police and the Fire Service, with the  Queen's Police Medal and the Queen's Fire Service Medal both instituted on 19 May 1954.  Recipients from 1969 to 8 September 2022 may use the post-nominal letters “QFSM”. Recipients from 8 September 2022 may use the post-nominal letters "KFSM".

The award has two categories. The most common is the King's Fire Service Medal for Distinguished Service. The equivalent medal for gallantry, the King's Fire Service Medal for Gallantry, can only be awarded posthumously and has, up to 2022, never been awarded, with members of the fire service also eligible for the George Cross, George Medal and the King's Gallantry Medal.

There is provision for the forfeiture of the award in the event of a recipient later being convicted of a criminal offence.

Design
 The medal is silver and 36 millimetres in diameter, with the ribbon suspended from a ring.
 The obverse bears the profile of Queen Elizabeth II.
 The reverse shows a standing figure with a sword and shield, with an inscription of "For Distinguished Fire Service" around the medal's edge. The gallantry version has the words "For Gallantry" in the exergue. 
 The name of the recipient is inscribed on the rim of the medal.
The King's Fire Service Medal for Gallantry has a single thin dark blue stripe running through the centre of each yellow stripe.

See also
 King's Police Medal
 British and Commonwealth orders and decorations

References

External links

Civil awards and decorations of the United Kingdom
Courage awards
Fire service awards and honors